This is a list of all public libraries in Malta and Gozo by locality:

A

Attard Public Library, St. Nicholas College, Hal Warda Street, Attard.

B

Birgu Public Library, Auberge d'Angleterre, North West Street, Birgu.
Birkirkara Regional Public Library, B'Kara Civic Centre, T. Fenech Street, Birkirkara.
Birzebbugia Public Library, St. Benedict College, St. Michael Street, Birżebbuġa.
Bormla Public Library, Oratory Street, Cospicua.

D

Dingli Public Library, St. Nicholas College, Main Street, Dingli.

F

Fgura Public Library, St. Thomas More College, Carmel Street, Fgura.

G

Gozo General Hospital Library, Tal-Ibraġ, Victoria, Gozo.
Gudja Public Library, St. Benedict College, St. Mark Streer, Gudja.
Gzira Public Library, Gzira Boys' Secondary School, N. Ellul Street, Gżira.

Għ

Għajnsielem Public Library, Anton Cassar Primary School, J.F. de Chambray Street, Għajnsielem, Gozo.
Għarb Public Library, Għarb Local Council, Visitation Street, Għarb, Gozo.
Għargħur Public Library, Maria Regina College, St. Bartholomeo Street, Għargħur.
Għasri Public Library, Għasri Local Council, Dun K. Caruana Street, Għasri, Gozo.
Għaxaq Public Library, Alley 1, St. Philip Street, Għaxaq.

H

Hamrun Public Library, St. George Preca College, Hamrun Primary, G. Pace Street, Ħamrun.

K

Kalkara Public Library, St. Michael Street, Kalkara.
Kerċem Public Library, Peter Paul Grech Primary, Orvieta Square, Kerċem, Gozo.
Kirkop Public Library, Kirkop Primary, St. Benedict Street, Kirkop.

L

Lija Public Library, Lija-Balzan Primary, R. Mifsud Bonnici Street, Lija.
Luqa Public Library, St. Ignatius College, St. Andrew Street, Luqa.

M

Marsa Public Library, Marsa.
Marsaxlokk Public Library, St. Thomas More College, Arznell Street, Marsaxlokk. Librarian -Carmen Scicluna
Mellieha Public Library, Mellieha Primary School, New Mill Street, Mellieħa.
Mgarr Public Library, Mgarr Primary, Fisher Street, Mġarr.
Mosta Public Library, Mosta Civic Centre, Constitution Street, Mosta.
Mqabba Public Library, Mqabba Primary, Valletta Road, Mqabba.
Msida Public Library, Msida Local Council, Menqa Square, Msida.

N

Nadur Public Library, Dun Salv Vella Primary School, Race Course Street, Nadur, Gozo.
Naxxar Public Library, Naxxar Civic Centre, 21 September Avenue, Naxxar.

P

Pembroke Public Library, Pembroke Local Council, Pembroke.

Q

Qala Public Library, Qala Civic Centre, Bishop Buttigieg Street, Qala, Gozo.
Qormi San Ġorġ Public Library, Qormi St. George's Primary, F. Maempel Square, Qormi.
Qormi St. Sebastian's Regional Library, St. Sebastian's Primary School, M. Dimech Street, Qormi.
Qrendi Public Library, Qrendi Primary, Kurat Mizzi Street, Qrendi.

R

Rabat Regional Library, Rabat Civic Centre, Rabat.
Raħal Ġdid Regional Library, Paola Primary, G. D'Amato Street, Paola.

S

Safi Public Library, Safi Primary, Dun G. Caruana Street, Safi.
San Ġiljan Public Library, St. Julian's Primary, Lapsi Street, San Ġiljan.
San Ġwann Public Library, San Ġwann Primary, School Street, San Ġwann.
San Lawrenz Public Library, Dun Salv Portelli Primary School, Our Lady of Sorrows Street, San Lawrenz, Gozo.
San Pawl il-Baħar Public Library, St. Paul's Bay Primary, School Street, San Pawl il-Baħar.
Sannat Public Library, Guze' Aquilina Primary, Sannat Road, Sannat, Gozo.
Senglea Public Library, Senglea Civic Centre, 4 September Square, Senglea.
Siġġiewi Public Library, Siġġiewi Primary, Dr. N. Zammit Street, Siġġiewi.
Sliema Public Library, Sliema Primary, B. Huber Street, Sliema.
Sta. Venera Public Library, Boys' Secondary School, St. Joseph High Road, Santa Venera.

 
Malta
Library
Library